Johannesberg may refer to:

 Johannesberg, Bavaria, Germany
 Janov nad Nisou, a village in the Czech Republic, known as Johannesberg in German
 Jánský vrch, a castle in the Czech Republic, known as Johannesberg in German
 Battle of Johannesberg of the Seven Years' War
 Janževa Gora, Slovenia, known as Johannesberg in German

See also 
 Johannesburg, a city in South Africa
 Johannesburg (disambiguation)
 Johannisberg (disambiguation)
 Johannisburg (disambiguation)